Bent-toed gecko may refer to geckos in the following genera:

 Cyrtopodion
 Cyrtodactylus

Animal common name disambiguation pages